Lake Ouachita State Park is a  public recreation area located  northwest of Hot Springs, on the eastern side of Lake Ouachita, which at  is the largest man-made lake located entirely within the state of Arkansas. In addition to its recreational offerings, the park preserves the site of the historic Three Sisters springs which were once touted for the curative properties of their mineral waters.

Activities and amenities
Park amenities include a visitors center, restaurant, cabins and campsites, marina, swimming area, hiking trails, boat ramps, and interpretive exhibits.

References

External links
 Lake Ouachita State Park Arkansas State Parks

State parks of Arkansas
Protected areas of Garland County, Arkansas
Protected areas established in 1955
1955 establishments in Arkansas